Kahaani is a 2012 Indian mystery  thriller film directed and co-produced by Sujoy Ghosh. The film stars Vidya Balan as the protagonist, and features Parambrata Chatterjee, Nawazuddin Siddiqui, and Saswata Chatterjee in supporting roles. The film was edited by Namrata Rao, with the cinematography provided by Setu. Set in the city of Kolkata during the festivities of Durga Puja, Kahaani follows the life of a pregnant woman, Vidya Bagchi (Vidya Balan), in search of her husband, a man whose existence is denied by the people she encounters.

The film garnered awards and nominations in several categories, with particular praise for its direction and the performance of the lead actress. As of 2014, the film has won 28 awards.

At the 58th Filmfare Awards ceremony, Kahaani won five awards, including Best Director for Ghosh and Best Actress for Vidya; the film was also nominated for Best Film. It was nominated in thirteen categories at the Screen Awards ceremony, including Best Film, with Vidya winning for Best Actress. At the 14th ceremony of the Zee Cine Awards, the film won awards in five categories, including Best Film – Critics and Best Actress – Critics. At the 8th Star Guild Awards, Kahaani won four awards, including Best Director and Best Actress, from eight nominations. In the 14th iteration of the International Indian Film Academy Awards, the film garnered five nominations, going on to win Best Actress and Best Editing for Rao. The film won three honours—Best Screenplay (Original) for Ghosh, Best Editing, and a Special Jury prize for Siddiqui—at the 60th ceremony of India's National Film Awards.

Accolades

See also
 List of Bollywood films of 2012

Footnotes

References

External links
 Accolades for Kahaani at the Internet Movie Database

Lists of accolades by Indian film